Lee Brian Caldicott (born 26 June 1969) is a former English cricketer. Caldicott was a right-handed batsman who bowled right-arm fast-medium. He was born at Stourport-on-Severn, Worcestershire.

Caldicott made his debut for Herefordshire in the 1997 Minor Counties Championship against Devon. From 1997 to 1998, he represented the county in 4 Championship matches, the last of which came against Dorset.  In 1999, he played 2 MCCA Knockout Trophy matches for the county against Wales Minor Counties and Wiltshire.

It was in 1999 that he made a single List A appearance for Herefordshire against Wiltshire in the 2nd round of the 1999 NatWest Trophy.  In his only List A match, he scored an unbeaten 35 runs and with the ball he took 3 wickets at a bowling average of 12.33, with best figures of 3/37.

References

External links
Lee Caldicott at Cricinfo
Lee Caldicott at CricketArchive

1969 births
Living people
People from Stourport-on-Severn
English cricketers
Herefordshire cricketers
Sportspeople from Worcestershire